Augustina Ebhomien Sunday (born 23 August 1996) is a Nigerian badminton player. She educated English and Literature at the Benson Idahosa University, and in 2015, she competed at the Summer Universiade In Gwangju, South Korea.

Career 
In 2013, she won the women's singles title at the Nigeria International partnering Uchechukwu Deborah Ukeh. Partnered with Dorcas Ajoke Adesokan, they finished runner-up at the 2014 Uganda International.

In 2015, she competed at the African Games and was part of the team that won the bronze medal. In 2019, she helps the Nigeria team won the African Championships, while in the women's doubles, she won the bronze medal.

Achievements

African Championships 
Women's doubles

BWF International Challenge/Series 
Women's doubles

  BWF International Challenge tournament
  BWF International Series tournament
  BWF Future Series tournament

References

External links 
 

1996 births
Living people
Nigerian female badminton players
Competitors at the 2015 African Games
African Games bronze medalists for Nigeria
African Games medalists in badminton
Benson Idahosa University alumni
21st-century Nigerian women